Raja Ram Karki is a Nepali politician belonging to Nepali Congress. He is also serving as member of the Bagmati Province Provincial Assembly. Karki vied for the post of general secretary of Nepali Congress in 14th general convention of Nepali Congress from Bimalendra Nidhi pannel.

Political life 
Karki is former member of Central working committee of Nepali Congress. Karki has also served as general secretary of Nepal Tarun Dal.

References 

Living people
Nepali Congress politicians from Bagmati Province
Year of birth missing (living people)
Members of the Provincial Assembly of Bagmati Province